Jean-Michel Aguirre (born Tostat, 2 November 1951) is a former French rugby union player. He played as a Scrum-half  and Fullback.

Aguirre played for Stade Bagnérais. He started his career as a Scrum-half but his usual positions became Fullback. Jean-Michel Aguirre earned his first national cap on 27 November 1971 against the  Australia at Colombes.

Honours 
 Grand Slam : 1977.
 French rugby champion finalist, 1979, 1981 with Stade Bagnérais.

References

External links
Jean-Michel Aguirre International Statistics

1951 births
French rugby union players
Living people
France international rugby union players
Rugby union scrum-halves
Sportspeople from Hautes-Pyrénées
French rugby union coaches